Killbot was an American electronic dance music trio formed in January 2012. The lineup includes JDevil (Jonathan Davis of Korn), Sluggo (Nick Suddarth) and Tyler Blue. Killbot's music is a fusion of dubstep, electro, drum and bass, and moombahton.

History 
The band's first release, "I'll Fuck It",  debuted on Spin's official website on September 28, 2012. Another track, "Wrecked", was world premiered on Dubstep.net on October 8, 2012. "Feel Alive" debuted on ARTISTdirect on October 22, 2012.  Their debut EP, Sound Surgery, was released via Dim Mak Records on October 22, 2012, peaking at number two on the iTunes dance chart within the first 24 hours of availability. The "Sound Surgery" EP was named #9 on ARTISTdirect Top 10 Albums of 2012.

In April 2014, the trio posted a status update that their next album is currently under production and is nearing completion. The month after, they posted a comment made by Sluggo quoting; "On my way to Los Angeles to Finish the Killbot album, with iwrestledabearonce's Steven Bradley!".

Discography

Albums

Remixes

References

External links 

2012 establishments in the United States
American drum and bass musical groups
American electronic dance music groups
Dub musical groups
Dubstep musicians
Korn solo projects
Musical groups established in 2012